Association Sportive Port-Louis 2000 is a Mauritian football club based in Port Louis. AS Port-Louis 2000 plays in the Mauritian Premier League. Their last title was won in 2016. The club was formed following the regionalisation of football in Mauritius by a merger between the Roche Bois-based Roche Bois Boys Scouts (RBBS)-St Martin United FC and Century Welfare Association of the Cite Martial suburb of Port-Louis.

Stadium
Football stadium St. François Xavier Stadium (cap. 5,000), located in Port Louis, Mauritius is the home to AS Port-Louis 2000.
The team also has its club house and training ground inside the premises of the Champ de Mars Racecourse.

Notable coaches
  Joe Tshupula
  Fidy Rasonaivo
  Sakoor Boodhun

Achievements
Mauritian League: 6
2002, 2003, 2003/04, 2004/05, 2011, 2015/16

Mauritian Cup: 2
2002, 2005

Mauritian Republic Cup: 4
2001, 2004, 2005, 2013/14

Performance in CAF competitions
CAF Champions League: 4 appearances
2003 – Second Round
2004 – First Round
2005 – Preliminary Round
2006 – First Round

References

Football clubs in Mauritius
Port Louis
2000 establishments in Mauritius
Association football clubs established in 2000